"5 Star" is a song by Yo Gotti. Hot Rod produced the single, which was released on May 20, 2009. The music video, released in August 2009, includes a cameo appearance by Rick Ross.

Promotion
The song benefitted from heavy promotion on MTV, MTV2 and BET and a lot of airplay.  It entered the Billboard Hot 100 the week of November 17 at number 79.

Music video
The music video was shot in Los Angeles and premiered on 106 & Park two months prior to the remix video.  The remix video premiered on 106 & Park on October 9, 2009, later peaking at number one and ranking at number 25 on BET's Notarized Top 100 Videos of 2009 countdown.

Remixes
The official remix has two versions, both versions have a new verse by Yo Gotti and verses by rappers Gucci Mane & Trina. The original remix, has a verse by Lil Boosie but Because of Lil' Boosie's impending four-year prison sentence, he was unable to attend the video shoot, so a second version was needed for the video.  That version, now the main official remix, has a verse by Young Money artist Nicki Minaj replacing Boosie's verse.  The explicit version of the remix with Nicki Minaj was released as a digital single on November 9, 2009.

The remix featuring Gucci Mane, Trina, and Nicki Minaj was included in the album instead of the original version.

Charts

Weekly charts

Year-end charts

Certifications

References

External links
5 Star Bitch on Myspace

2009 singles
Yo Gotti songs
Songs written by Nicki Minaj
Nicki Minaj songs
2009 songs
Songs written by Yo Gotti
Music videos directed by Dale Resteghini